Music for Moviebikers is the third album by Norwegian pop/experimental singer-songwriter Kaada. It was released in 2006 by Ipecac Recordings.

Track listing

Personnel
Conducted by : Baldakhin

Joe Young : vocals, keyboards, tannerin
Cain Marko : clarinets
Renate Engevold : violin
Hanne Haarbye : viola
Håvard Bilsbak : Cello
Sigrun Eng : Cello
Riccardo Ghazala : Dulcitone
Jane Helen Johansen : Kalimba, acc guitars, mandolin, vocals
Sergiov Scarlatto : Dulcimer, Stoessel-laute
Øyvind Storesund – whistling
Nikolai Hængsle Eilertsen : el-bass, Fender bass VI, e sitar
Sergiov Scarlatto : Dulcimer, Stoessel-laute
Erland Dahlen : Perc
Else Olsen Storesund – harding fiddle
Ziv Weissmuller : Psaltery
Børge Fjordheim : drums
Dan Dare : mallets
Rolf Y. Uggen : el-guitar
Marte Wulff : vocal
Theresa Drift :  vocal, Glass Harmonica
Geir Sundstøl : steelguitar and el-guitar (Number 8)
Per Zanussi : Saw

Lyrics on 2 by Sidna Ali the Moslem (9th Century)

Mixed by Kaada at Wrongroom
Mastering by Frank ArkWright
Design by Martin Kvamme –
Photos by Observatoriet

External links
 Official website
Internet Movie Database Profile
Cloroform – Kaadas rockband
Kaada at Ipecac Recordings
soundcloud.com/kaada
kaadapatton official site

Kaada albums
Ipecac Recordings albums
2006 albums